WMTR-FM is a radio station that broadcasts at 96.1 MHz on the FM dial in Archbold, Ohio. Airing a classic hits format, it is the primary local station for the Archbold/Fulton County area (including the cities of Delta, Swanton and Wauseon), and its 3,800-watt signal can be heard NW Ohio in the north to Michigan state line. The station is also listenable in the western suburbs of Toledo and is frequently rated in the Toledo Arbitron ratings reports. Its studios are in Archbold and the transmitter is located northeast of the city.

History
WMTR-FM began broadcasting in 1968 at 95.9 on the FM dial and formerly bore the callsign WHFD (which were the first letters of the 4 counties in its broadcast region—Williams, Henry, Fulton, and Defiance).  The current call letters were adopted in 1989 and are legally WMTR-FM due to there being a WMTR (AM) in Morristown, New Jersey.  Programming over the years has changed from adult contemporary to oldies as "96 Gold" to the current classic/adult hits format.  The station is owned by Northwestern Ohio Broadcasting Corporation and prides itself on the fact that it is still locally owned and operated.  Max Smith, Sr. founded the station, which is managed today by his son, Max Smith, Jr.  In a note of historical significance, WMTR-FM was one of the first commercial radio stations in the nation to convert to DAT technology in the late 1980s, considered state-of-the-art for the time.

WMTR-FM also has a strong sports commitment.   WMTR covers high school sports and carries both Detroit Tigers baseball and Ohio State University football.  In the fall of 2011, WMTR joined the Rocket Sports Radio Network, carrying University of Toledo football and men's basketball games.

The station acquired an FM translator at 94.3 (W232CM) in late 2016.  W232CM relays the HD2 signal of WMTR-FM, offering country music to the Wauseon area.

The station is an affiliate of the "Floydian Slip" syndicated Pink Floyd program.

External links

MTR-FM
Classic hits radio stations in the United States
Radio stations established in 1968